This is a list of both active and inactive Wrestling Observer Newsletter awards created by professional wrestling and mixed martial arts (MMA) journalist Dave Meltzer. The first fourteen awards were created in 1980 as an informal poll between Meltzer and his friends and others he corresponded with on the subject of professional wrestling at the time. After starting the Wrestling Observer in 1982, the awards took on a greater life, with an increasing number of awards given out every year.

The awards were created to recognize the individual achievements of a select few wrestlers who exemplified a specified criterion. The awards are given every year in various categories such as Wrestler of the Year, Most Outstanding Wrestler, Tag Team of the Year, Most Improved, Pro Wrestling Match of the Year, etc.; there are also a handful of awards to recognize the dubious distinctions in the business during that year such as Most Overrated and Worst Match. There are currently forty-five categories that are actively assessed every year and twenty that are no longer active. The awards are voted for by the newsletter's paying readership, primarily wrestling fans, although it is claimed that some industry workers also vote.

The awards are organized into two categories. For "Category A" awards, voters indicate their top three choices. First choices are awarded five points, second places three points, and third places two points. The choice with the most points overall wins. For "Category B" awards, voters simply indicate their top choice. For the "Category B" Shad Gaspard/Jon Huber Memorial Award, the recipients are chosen by a committee headed by Meltzer.

Over the years, various MMA promotions or individual mixed martial artists were deemed eligible to win some awards when it seemed as though they were more deserving to win than the conventional wrestler or wrestling promotion. This led to, in 1997, the creation of Shootfighter of the Year and Shoot Match of the Year to recognize MMA achievement specifically. Still, some primarily professional wrestling-focused awards remained intact for MMA promotions/fighters to win, due to the similar business aspect between both sports (i.e. Best Box Office Draw and Promotion of the Year). In the December 3, 2007 edition of the Wrestling Observer Newsletter, it was announced that from that year onwards, mixed martial artists are no longer eligible for the Lou Thesz/Ric Flair Award, thus reserving it for professional wrestlers only. Shootfighter of the Year was renamed to Most Outstanding Fighter and Shoot Match of the Year was renamed to MMA Match of the Year to match a new award called Mixed Martial Arts Most Valuable, which is similar to the Lou Thesz/Ric Flair Award except it is for mixed martial artists.

Current awards

"Category A" awards

Lou Thesz/Ric Flair Award (Wrestler of the Year)

Mixed Martial Arts Most Valuable

Most Outstanding Wrestler

Most Outstanding Fighter of the Year

Tag Team of the Year

Best on Interviews

Promotion of the Year

Best Weekly TV Show

Pro Wrestling Match of the Year

MMA Match of the Year

"Category B" awards

United States/Canada MVP

Japan MVP

Mexico MVP

Europe MVP

Danny Hodge Memorial Award (Non-Heavyweight MVP)

Women's Wrestling MVP

Women's MMA MVP

Best Box Office Draw

Feud of the Year

Most Improved

Most Charismatic

Bryan Danielson Award (Best Technical Wrestler)

Bruiser Brody Memorial Award (Best Brawler)

Best Flying Wrestler

Most Overrated

Most Underrated

Rookie of the Year

Best Non-Wrestler

Best Television Announcer

Worst Television Announcer

Best Major Wrestling Show

Worst Major Wrestling Show

Best Wrestling Maneuver

Most Disgusting Promotional Tactic

Worst Television Show

Worst Match of the Year

Worst Feud of the Year

Worst Promotion of the Year

Best Booker

Promoter of the Year

Best Gimmick

Worst Gimmick

Best Pro Wrestling Book

Best Pro Wrestling DVD/Streaming Documentary

Shad Gaspard/Jon Huber Memorial Award

Defunct awards

Class A awards

Most Impressive Wrestler

Most Washed Up Wrestler

Strongest Wrestler

Best Three-Man Team

Most Unimproved

Most Obnoxious

Best Babyface

Best Heel

Biggest Shock of the Year

Hardest Worker

Manager of the Year

Class B awards

Best Color Commentator

Readers' Favorite Wrestler

Readers' Least Favorite Wrestler

Worst Wrestler

Worst Tag Team

Worst Manager

Worst on Interviews

Most Embarrassing Wrestler

Worst Non-Wrestling Personality

Wrestling Observer Decade Awards

2000s
Best Wrestler: Kurt Angle
Most Outstanding Wrestler: Bryan Danielson/Daniel Bryan
Best Box Office Draw: Místico
Best Tag Team: Rey Bucanero and Último Guerrero
Best Interviews: Chris Jericho
Most Charismatic: John Cena
MMA Most Valuable: Randy Couture

2010s
Best Wrestler: Hiroshi Tanahashi
Most Outstanding Wrestler: Kazuchika Okada
Best Box Office Draw: Brock Lesnar
Best Tag Team: The Young Bucks
Best Interviews: Paul Heyman
Most Charismatic: Hiroshi Tanahashi
Best Technical Wrestler: Zack Sabre Jr.
Best Brawler: Tomohiro Ishii
Best Flyer: Ricochet
Best Promotion: New Japan Pro-Wrestling
Best Matches: Kazuchika Okada
Best Non-Wrestler: Paul Heyman
Best Television Announcer: Kevin Kelly

See also
 Wrestling Observer Newsletter Hall of Fame
 List of professional wrestling awards
 List of Pro Wrestling Illustrated awards
 Slammy Award

References

Sources
 
 
 
 
 
 

Awards established in 1980
Professional wrestling awards
Wrestling Observer Newsletter awards
Wrestling Observer Newsletter